This is a list of British ground forces in the Falklands War. For a list of ground forces from Argentina, see Argentine ground forces in the Falklands War

Land Forces 
 

The land forces employed by the United Kingdom during the Falklands War amounted to a divisional sized formation, named as Land Forces Falkland Islands, consisting of two brigades:
3 Commando Brigade - formed primarily by the Royal Marines, 3 Commando Brigade was the primary British rapid reaction force, tasked with reinforcing the NATO northern flank in Norway in the event of war with the Soviet Union in Europe. 3 Commando Brigade was the formation with most experience of amphibious operations. In its NATO role, 3 Commando Brigade was reinforced by the Dutch Korps Mariniers. However, the situation required reinforcement by British units, with the result that 2nd & 3rd Battalions of the Parachute Regiment  were reassigned from 5 Infantry Brigade.
5 Infantry Brigade - the UK's main "out of area" reaction formation, tasked with operations outside the European theatre. At the time, it would normally be formed using two battalions of the Parachute Regiment, together with the UK based Gurkha battalion. However, since both 2 PARA and 3 PARA were used to reinforce 3 Commando Brigade for the initial landings in the Falklands, 5 Brigade was reinforced with two battalions of Foot Guards then on public duties in London along with the Gurkha battalion. These were chosen owing to the fact that they were immediately available, as they were neither on internal security duties in Northern Ireland nor attached to BAOR. The brigade was further strengthened by No. 63 Squadron RAF Regiment, (based at RAF Gütersloh, Germany, initially to provide additional Short Range Air Defence (SHORAD) Short range air defense of land forces landing at San Carlos Water.

Land Forces HQ 

 Commander, Land Forces, Falkland Islands (CLFFI): Major-General JJ Moore, Royal Marines
 Deputy commander: Brigadier CJ Waters
 Commander, Royal Artillery: Colonel BT Pennicott

3 Commando Brigade 
Commander: Brigadier JHA Thompson
 29 Commando Regiment Royal Artillery (Lt Col MJ Holroyd Smith)
 7th (Sphinx) Battery Royal Artillery / 105 mm L118 Light Guns x 6 Land Rover 101 Forward Control x 6　Land Rover series IIA x 6
 8th (Alma) Battery Royal Artillery / 105 mm L118 Light Guns x 6 Land Rover 101 Forward Control x 6　Land Rover series IIA x 6
 79th (Kirkee) Battery Royal Artillery / 105 mm L118 Light Guns x 6 Land Rover 101 Forward Control x 6　Land Rover series IIA x 6
 148th (Meiktila) Battery (Primary role is as a Naval Gunfire Support Forward Observation (NGSFO) battery.)
 40 Commando, Royal Marines (Lt Col MPJ Hunt) — Blue Beach 1 - Sapper Hill. (†1)
 42 Commando, Royal Marines (Lt Col NF Vaux) — Mount Kent - Mount Harriet. (†2)
 45 Commando, Royal Marines (Lt Col AF Whitehead) — Red Beach - Douglas Settlement - Two Sisters. (†12)
 2nd Battalion, Parachute Regiment (Lt Col H Jones VC) — Blue Beach 2 - Goose Green & Darwin - Wireless Ridge. (†18)
 29th Field Battery RA 
 43 (Lloyds) Air Defence Battery 
 1st troop / Blowpipe x 6、Leyland 4-tonne truck x 6
 2nd troop / Blowpipe x 6、Leyland 4-tonne truck x 6
 3rd troop / Blowpipe x 6、Leyland 4-tonne truck x 6
 9 Parachute Squadron Royal Engineers (†4) 
 10th Field Troop, / Land Rover 101FC Ambulance x 16
 81st Department Ordnance Company 
 613th Tactical Air Control Party

 3rd Battalion, Parachute Regiment (Lt Col HWR Pike) — Green Beach - Teal Inlet - Mount Longdon. (†21)
 1st Ordnance Coy Detachment / Land Rover 109 S111 Ambulance x 1　
 Commando Logistic Regiment, Royal Marines (Lt Col I Helberg) (†1) Bedford MK UBRE (Unit Bulk Refuelling Equipment) x9 comprising (Civgas x5, Dieso x3, AVCAT x1), ROF Nottingham Eager Beaver Air Portable Fork Lift Truck (APFLT) x8, Can-Am motorcycles x8.
 3 Commando Brigade HQ and Signals Squadron (Maj R Dixon) (†1)
 3 Commando Brigade Aviation Squadron (Major CP Cameron) / 9 x Gazelle AH.1 helicopters (†3)　6 x Scout helicopters (†1)
 Reconnaissance Troops (Lt M Coreth) 
 B Squadron, Blues and Royals / FV101 Scorpion x 4、FV107 Scimitar x 4、FV106 Samson x 1
 T Battery (Shah Sujah's Troop) Royal Artillery 12 Air Defence Regiment / Rapier Missile FS.A Launcher x 12、Land Rover 101 Forward Control x 12
 Air Defence Troop / Blowpipe Missile launchers x 12　Leyland 4-tonne truck x 12　Land Rover 109 series III x 12　
 1st Raiding Squadron, Royal Marines (Capt Chris Baxter) / Rigid Raiding Craft x 17
 Mountain and Arctic Warfare Cadre, Royal Marines (Capt Rod Boswell)
SBS (Maj Jonathan Thomson) 67 men　(†1)
 2nd, 3rd and 6th Sections
 22 SAS (Lt Col HM Rose) 107 men (†19)
 D and G Squadrons
 1  Tactical Air Control Party
 2  Tactical Air Control Party
 3  Tactical Air Control Party
 maintenance group
 Rear link detachment, 30 Signal Regiment (†3)
 Elements of 17 Port Regiment Royal Corps of Transport.
 3 x Mexeflote 　detachments. 
 5 x Landing ship 　logistics detachments.
 2 x FV 4018 Centurion BARV　
 3 x Surgical support teams
 Postal courier communications unit detachment of 2 PC Regiment RE, 20 PC Sqn RE (tasked 3 CDO Bde support) & 21 PC Sqn RE (tasked 5 Airborne Bde support)
 Detachment 47 Air Despatch Squadron RCT.
 59 Independent Commando Squadron Royal Engineers (Maj Roderick Macdonald). (†3)
 2 Troop 9 Parachute Squadron Royal Engineers (Capt Robbie Burns)
 Detachment 49 EOD Squadron, 33 Engineer Regiment Royal Engineers (†1)
 2 man bomb disposal team
 Y Troop Royal Marines (electronic warfare)
 Commando Forces Band (stretcher-bearers)

 - Replaced by Lt Col David Chaundler

5 Infantry Brigade 
Commander: Brigadier MJA Wilson
 Headquarters 5 Infantry Brigade
 5 Infantry Brigade HQ and Signals Squadron (205) Royal Signals (Major Mike Forge)
 2nd Battalion, Scots Guards (Lt Col MIE Scott) — Mount Tumbledown. (†8)
 1st Battalion, Welsh Guards (Lt Col JF Rickett) — Sapper Hill. (†33)
 1st Battalion, 7th Duke of Edinburgh's Own Gurkha Rifles (Lt Col DPdeC Morgan) — Mount William. (†1)
 97 (Lawson's Company) Battery Royal Artillery (of 4 Field Regiment RA, see below)
6 x 105 mm L118 Light Guns
6 x Land Rover 101 Forward Control
 6 x Land Rover 109
 4 Field Regiment, RA (HQ, 29th and 97th Batteries)
36 Engineer Regiment RE (Lt Col G Field OBE (CRE))
9 Parachute Squadron RE (Maj CM Davis)
11 Field Squadron RE (Maj Bruce Hawken) arrived San Carlos 25 May under command 3 Commando Brigade Royal Marines. They switched to under command CO 36 Engineer Regiment (as Divisional troops) when they landed around 2 June
61 Field Support Squadron RE (Maj Taffy Morgan)
1 x Field Troop, 20 Field Squadron RE (att 9 Para Sqn RE) (Capt D Foxley)
 STRE
 Postal section
 656 Squadron Army Air Corps (†2)　Gazelle helicopter × 6　Scout Helicopter × 6
 10 Field Workshop Royal Electrical and Mechanical Engineers (†3) / Land Rover 101FC Ambulance (†3) × 16　Land Rover 88 series III × 16
 81 Ordnance Company Royal Army Ordnance Corps
 Forward Air Control Party
 2 x FAC
 Army Catering Corps (†4)
 407 Troop, Royal Corps of Transport, (2Lt Ash)
 63 Squadron RAF Regiment
8 x Rapier Missile FS.A Launchers and Blindfire radar, FSA, DN181.
8 x Land Rover 101 Forward Control
8 x Land Rover 109
8 x Bandvagn 202
 518 Company, Royal Pioneer Corps

Infantry weapons 

 L9A1 Browning
 L1A1 SLR (main infantry weapon)
 L42A1 (Sniper rifle)
 L2-A2 (Hand grenade)
 M79 (infantry grenade launcher)
 L4A3 Bren 
 L7A2 GPMG
 L14A1 Carl Gustav Recoilless Rifle
 Rocket 66mm HEAT L1A1
 MILAN ATGM (used against Argentine bunkers)
 L9A1 51 mm Mortar
 L16A1 81 mm Mortar
 Blowpipe MANPADS (infantry use)
 FIM-92 Stinger MANPADS (special forces use)
 M16A1 & M203 (special forces weapon)
 CAR-15 (special forces weapon)
 L2A3 Sterling (support services weapon i.e. for tank crewmen, engineers and artillerymen, some troops within RN Commando Regiment)

See also
 British air services in the Falklands War
 British naval forces in the Falklands War

References

Sources
 The Battle For The Falklands, Max Hastings and Simon Jenkins, 1983, Michael Joseph Ltd., 
 The Official History of the Falklands Campaign, Sir Lawrence Freedman, 2005, Routledge,

External links 
 3 Commando Bde RM - 5 Infantry Bde
 Website showing all weapons, tanks and artillery used by the British

Falklands War orders of battle
 
1982 in the Falkland Islands